or  is a fjord in Salangen Municipality in Troms og Finnmark county, Norway. The  fjord flows to the northeast from the Astafjorden and then turns to the southeast until it reaches the village of Sjøvegan at the head of the fjord. The innermost part of the fjord is also named the Sagfjorden.

References

Fjords of Troms og Finnmark
Salangen